The South African Railways Class  of 1976 is a branch line diesel-electric locomotive.

Between September 1976 and June 1978, the South African Railways placed one hundred Class  General Motors Electro-Motive Division type GT18MC diesel-electric locomotives in branch line service. In 1977, one more Class  locomotive was built for Columbus Stainless in Middelburg, Transvaal.

Manufacturer 
The Class  type GT18MC diesel-electric locomotive was designed by General Motors Electro-Motive Division (GM-EMD) and built in two batches for the South African Railways (SAR) by General Motors South Africa (GMSA) in Port Elizabeth.

In addition, another single Class  GT18MC locomotive was built new in 1977 for Columbus Stainless, a large stainless steel plant which was established in Middelburg, Transvaal in 1965.

Distinguishing features 

Service 
The Class 35 family is South Africa’s standard branch line diesel-electric locomotive. The GM-EMD Class  were designed for light rail conditions and they work on most branch lines in the central, eastern, northern and northeastern parts of the country.

Works numbers 
The Class  builder’s works numbers are listed in the table.

Liveries 
The Class 35-600 were all delivered in the SAR Gulf Red livery with signal red buffer beams, yellow side stripes on the long hood sides and a yellow V on each end. In the 1990s many of them began to be repainted in the Spoornet orange livery with a yellow and blue chevron pattern on the buffer beams. Several later received the Spoornet maroon livery. In the late 1990s many were repainted in the Spoornet blue livery with outline numbers on the long hood sides. After 2008 in the Transnet Freight Rail (TFR) and Passenger Rail Agency of South Africa (PRASA) era, many were repainted in the TFR red, green and yellow livery and at least one was repainted in the PRASA blue livery.

Illustration

References 

3450
C-C locomotives
Co′Co′ locomotives
Co+Co locomotives
Electro-Motive Division locomotives
GMSA locomotives
Cape gauge railway locomotives
Railway locomotives introduced in 1976
1976 in South Africa